Live at the 100 Club is a live album by The Jam, recorded on 11 September 1977 at London's 100 Club. The album was released in 2015 on CD as part of the box set Fire and Skill – The Jam Live, and in 2016 as a double album on vinyl.

Track listing 
First disc

Second disc

Personnel
The Jam
 Paul Weller – vocals, lead guitar, bass guitar, keyboards, backing vocals
 Rick Buckler – drums, percussion
 Bruce Foxton – vocals, bass guitar, rhythm guitar, backing vocals

References

The Jam albums
2015 albums